Nate Duffy  was an American football coach.  He served as the head football coach at Hillsdale College in Hillsdale, Michigan for one season in 1897, compiling a record of 1–1–1.

References

Year of death missing
Year of birth missing
Hillsdale Chargers football coaches
Michigan Wolverines football players